Wind River may refer to:

Places

Canada
Wind River (Yukon)

United States
Wind River (Yukon–Koyukuk Census Area, Alaska), a designated National Wild and Scenic River
Wind River (Colorado)
Wind River (Oregon)
Wind River (Washington)
Wind River (Wisconsin)
Wind River (Wyoming)
Wind River Basin, a semi-arid intermontane foreland basin in central Wyoming
Wind River Canyon, a canyon made from tectonic plate shifting in Wyoming
Wind River Indian Reservation in Wyoming
Wind River Range of Wyoming
Wind River Peak

Films
Wind River (film), a 2017 film by Taylor Sheridan
Wind River, a 2000 film about Elijah Nicholas Wilson

Other uses
Wind River Experimental Forest in Washington
Wind River Systems, an embedded systems software company